Newton Wallop, 6th Earl of Portsmouth JP, DL (19 January 1856 – 4 December 1917), styled Viscount Lymington until 1891, was a British Liberal politician but then joined the Liberal Unionist Party in 1886. He later switched back to the Liberal Party to serve as Under-Secretary of State for War under Sir Henry Campbell-Bannerman from 1905 to 1908.

Background and education
Lymington was born in Hurstbourne Priors, Hampshire, the eldest son of Isaac Wallop, 5th Earl of Portsmouth, and his wife Lady Eveline Alicia Juliana Herbert, daughter of Henry Herbert, 3rd Earl of Carnarvon. He was educated at Eton College and from 1876 to 1879 at Balliol College, Oxford, where he was President of the Oxford Union.

Political career
Lymington was elected Member of Parliament (MP) for Barnstaple at a by-election in February 1880, a seat he held until 1885 when representation was reduced to one member under the Redistribution of Seats Act 1885. At the 1885 general election, he was elected MP for South Molton and held the seat until 1891.

In the latter year he succeeded his father in the earldom and took his seat in the House of Lords. From 1905 to 1908 Lord Portsmouth served as Under-Secretary of State for War in the Liberal administration of Sir Henry Campbell-Bannerman.

Lord Portsmouth was also a Justice of the Peace for Hampshire and Devon and a Deputy Lieutenant.

In 1908 he bought Guisachan House and its huge deer estate in Glen Affric from Baron Tweedsmouth. His widow put the estate on the market in 1919 after his death.

Family
Lord Portsmouth married Beatrice Mary Pease, only child of Edward Pease of Darlington, in 1885. He died in December 1917 at Whitchurch, aged 61, and was succeeded in the earldom by his younger brother, John. The Countess of Portsmouth died in 1935.

References

External links 
 

1856 births
1917 deaths
People educated at Eton College
Alumni of Balliol College, Oxford
6
Liberal Party (UK) MPs for English constituencies
UK MPs 1874–1880 
UK MPs 1880–1885
UK MPs 1885–1886
UK MPs 1886–1892
Portsmouth, E6
Liberal Unionist Party MPs for English constituencies
Presidents of the Oxford Union
Newton
Members of the Parliament of the United Kingdom for Barnstaple
People from Basingstoke and Deane